DDO 44 (or UGCA 133) is a dwarf spheroidal galaxy in the M81 Group, believed to be a satellite galaxy of the nearby NGC 2403.

Structure 
DDO 44 is a relatively large dwarf galaxy, and it has been observed to possess a tidal tail extending at least 50,000 parsecs from its center. It has an estimated metallicity ([Fe/H]) of -1.54 ± 0.14. Due to its proximity and relative velocity to the larger NGC 2403, it is believed to be NGC 2403's satellite galaxy. Stellar streams has been observed to originate from DDO 44, flowing towards and away for NGC 2403, indicating tidal disruptions. Around 20 percent of the galaxy's stars are believed to be of intermediate age (between 2-8 Gya), with the most recent stellar formation being estimated at 300 Mya due to a lack of young bright blue stars. This lack of bright stars caused DDO 44 to have a relatively low level of brightness. 

It is located approximately 3 million parsecs away from the Milky Way, and 79 arcminutes towards north-northwest from NGC 2403 (or approximately 75 kpc). Mass estimates based on luminosity measurements give a galactic mass of 2×107–6×107 M☉. This makes DDO 44 by far NGC 2403's most massive known satellite galaxy, with the other known satellite galaxy (MADCASH J074238+652501-dw) having a mass of just ~105 M☉. HI observations place an upper limit for DDO 44's hydrogen gas mass at 4×105 M☉.

References

Bibliography

Dwarf spheroidal galaxies
M81 Group
UGCA objects
Camelopardalis (constellation)